Walla Walla Community College (WWCC), often referred to as just “CC” locally, is a multi-campus community college in southeastern Washington state.

History 
Walla Walla Community College was founded in 1967 by Peter Dietrich when the region saw a need for a community college. It was first housed in the educational complex on Park St. previously occupied by Walla Walla High School before that school moved to its current facility south of town. When WWCC grew too big for this location, it purchased land to the east of town near the airport and built its current facilities there. Eventually a branch campus was established in Clarkston, WA, 100 miles to the east as well.

WWCC added one of its most important programs, the enological and viticulture program, in the late 1990s when the town of Walla Walla was facing economic uncertainty due to the decline of the agriculture industry locally. This program is responsible in part for the boom of the wine industry in Walla Walla in that it has graduated many of the winemakers of the over 175 wineries in the area today. From here WWCC has had several more non-traditional programs, in addition to more typical programs to meet the needs of the Walla Walla Valley such as the Commercial Truck Driver Program, John Deere Technology Program, and Water Technologies and Management Program.

Most recently, WWCC is in the process of completing the Southeast Area Tech Skills Center (SEA Tech Center) expansion. This includes a multimillion-dollar building at the main campus to house an array of new programs in cooperation with area high schools.

In 2013, Walla Walla Community College was awarded the Aspen Prize for Community College Excellence.

Campus 
The college is spread over three campuses in southeastern Washington state. The WWCC also maintains a facility at the Washington State Penitentiary.

Academics 
The college has an average annual enrollment of about 9,000 students. It has numerous areas of study and certificates, as well as 45 different associate degree programs.

Athletics 

WWCC fields teams (stylized as the Walla Walla Warriors) in eleven sports. In the Fall, Warrior Field plays host to men's and women's soccer, while volleyball takes center stage in the Dietrich Center – often referred to as 'The Dome'. The winter quarter sees The Dome taken over by the men's and women's basketball, while the spring months offer baseball, softball, men's and women's golf, and rodeo. The Warriors play in the Northwest Intercollegiate Athletic Association (NWAC)

Notable people 

 Mark Klicker, businessman and politician
 Tommy Lloyd, head men's basketball coach at University of Arizona, former assistant basketball coach at Gonzaga
 Chuck Martin, college basketball coach
 Kimo von Oelhoffen, NFL defensive tackle
 Ricky Pierce, professional basketball player
 Bryan Pittman, NFL long snapper
 Mike Sellers, NFL fullback for the Washington Football Team

References

External links
 Official website

 
Educational institutions established in 1967
Community colleges in Washington (state)
Universities and colleges accredited by the Northwest Commission on Colleges and Universities
Universities and colleges in Walla Walla, Washington